Michael Schwab (born 1952) is an American graphic designer and illustrator, he is the Principal at Michael Schwab Studio in San Anselmo, California. He was one of the founders of the San Francisco Bay Area postmodern movement in graphic design, that later became known as the "Pacific Wave".

Biography 
Michael Schwab was born and raised in Ardmore, Oklahoma. In 1970, he attended East Texas State University (now known as Texas A&M University–Commerce), where he remained for two years. Followed by one year of study of Advertising at School of Visual Arts (SVA) and then study at ArtCenter College of Design, the latter was where he received his degree in Graphic Design. In 1975, he moved to San Francisco to work as a poster artist.

In the early 1980s a few San Francisco–based designers were nicknamed “The Michaels” because they all had the same name (Schwab, alongside Mabry, Cronan, Manwaring, Vanderbyl), and later they were known as the "Pacific Wave" according to historian Steven Heller.

Some of Schwab's more popular works were logos designed for the Golden Gate National Parks Conservancy, produced during the 1990s. His clients have include Nike, Wells Fargo, Amtrak, Pebble Beach, Muhammad Ali, Robert Redford, and others.

Schwab's work is included in many public museum collections including Fine Arts Museums of San Francisco, San Francisco Museum of Modern Art (SFMoMA), Victoria and Albert Museum, National Portrait Gallery, among others.

Bibliography

References 

1952 births
American graphic designers
People from Ardmore, Oklahoma
Art Center College of Design alumni
School of Visual Arts alumni
Texas A&M University–Commerce alumni
Living people